The Chausath Yogini Temple (64-Yogini Temple) of Hirapur, also called Mahamaya Temple, is 20 km outside Bhubaneswar, the capital of Odisha state of Eastern India. It is devoted to the worship of the yoginis, auspicious goddess-like figures.

Religious aspect 

Hirapur's yogini temple is a tantric shrine, with hypaethral (roofless) architecture as tantric prayer rituals involve worshipping the bhumandala (environment consisting all the 5 elements of nature - fire, water, earth, air and ether), and the yoginis believed to be capable of flight.

The yogini idols represent female figures standing on an animal, a demon or a human head depicting the victory of Shakti (Feminine power). The idols express everything from rage, sadness, pleasure, joy, desire and happiness. The number 64 finds its reference in Hindu mythology in forms such as Kālá for time, Kalā for performing arts etc.

Such temples dedicated to yoginis, although rare, are also seen at Ranipur-Jharial site of the Balangir district in Odisha and seven other places in India.

History 

The temple is believed to have been built by Queen Hiradevi of the Bramha dynasty during the 9th century.

The legend behind the temple, according to local priests, is that the Goddess Durga took the form of 64 demi-goddesses to defeat a demon. After the fight the 64 goddesses, equated with yoginis, asked Durga to commemorate them in the form of a temple structure.

The temple complex is now maintained by Archaeological Survey of India.

Kalapahad, a converted Muslim general of 16th CE is believed to have attacked this temple as well and broken the Murtis. He is known as the destroyer of Puri and Konark temples.

Architecture 

The temple is small and circular, only 25 feet in diameter. It is hypaethral, and built of blocks of sandstone. The inside of the circular wall has niches, each housing the statue of a Goddess. 56 of the 64 idols, made of black stone, survive. They surround the main image at the centre of the temple, the Goddess Kali, who stands on a human head, representing the triumph of the heart over the mind. Some historians believe that an idol of Maha Bhairava was worshipped in the Chandi Mandapa. The temple seems to follow a mandala plan in a way that concentric circles are formed while a Shiva at the center inside the inner sanctum is roundly surrounded by four Yoginis and four Bhairavas.

The circle is reached via a protruding entrance passage, so that the plan of the temple has the form of a yoni-pedestal for a Shiva lingam.

The Yogini images depict standing goddesses and their animal vehicles (vahana). The Yoginis are naked but for their bejewelled girdles, from which hang flimsy skirts that can be made out as a light decoration on their legs; they are adorned with bracelets, armlets, necklaces, and anklets. 

The scholar István Keul writes that the yogini images are of dark chlorite rock, about 40 cm tall, and standing in varying poses on plinths or vahanas, their animal vehicles; most have "delicate features and sensual bodies with slender waists, broad hips, and high, round breasts" with varying hairstyles and body ornaments.

See also
 Chausath Yogini Temple, Bhedaghat

References

Bibliography

External links
 
 Detail Study

Ancient Indian culture
Hindu temples in Bhubaneswar
Archaeological monuments in Odisha
Sandstone buildings in India
Hindu temples in Khordha district
Kali temples
Tourist attractions in Bhubaneswar
Shaktism
Yogini temples